This is a list of castles and chateaux located in the Plzeň Region of the Czech Republic.

A
 Alfrédov Chateau
 Angerbach Castle

B

 Berchembogen Chateau
 Bezděkov Chateau
 Bezdružice Chateau
 Běhařov Chateau
 Bělá Castle
 Běšiny Chateau
 Bor u Tachova Chateau
 Brdo Castle
 Broumov Chateau
 Březina Castle
 Březina Chateau
 Březín Castle
 Buben Castle
 Budětice Castle
 Bušovice Chateau
 Bystřice nad Úhlavou Chateau

C

 Cebiv Chateau
 Chanovice Chateau
 Chocenice Chateau
 Chodová Planá Chateau
 Chotiměř Chateau
 Chříč Chateau
 Chudenice Chateau
 Částkov Chateau
 Čečovice Chateau
 Čeminy Chateau
 Černá Hať Chateau
 Červené Poříčí Chateau

D

 Defurovy Lažany Chateau
 Dolejší Krušec Chateau
 Dolejší Těšov Chateau
 Dolní Lukavice Chateau
 Domažlice Castle
 Dožice Chateau

F
 Falštejn Castle
 Frumštejn Castle

G
 Gutštejn Castle

H

 Hlavňovice Chateau
 Homberk Castle
 Horažďovice Chateau
 Horšovský Týn Chateau
 Hořákov Chateau
 Hrad pod Hrnčířem Castle
 Hrad u Strašína Castle
 Hradiště nad Javornicí Castle
 Hradiště Chateau
 Hřešihlavy Chateau
 Hrádek u České Břízy Castle
 Hrádek u Sušice Chateau
 Hrádek Castle

J
 Janovice nad Úhlavou Castle
 Jánský zámek Chateau
 Ježovy Chateau
 Jindřichovice Chateau

K

 Kaceřov Chateau
 Kalec Chateau
 Kamýk Chateau
 Kanice Chateau
 Karlov Chateau
 Kašperk Castle
 Klabava Castle
 Klenová Castle
 Kojšice Chateau
 Kokšín Castle
 Kolinec Chateau
 Komberk Castle
 Komošín Castle
 Kozel Chateau
 Krasíkov Castle
 Krašov Castle
 Křimice Chateau
 Kundratice Chateau
 Kyjov Castle

L

 Lacembok Castle
 Lazurová hora Castle
 Lázeň Chateau
 Lázně Letiny Chateau
 Lednice Chateau
 Liblín Chateau
 Libštejn Castle
 Lipová Lhota Chateau
 Litice Castle
 Lopata Castle
 Loreta Chateau
 Lovčice Chateau
 Luhov Chateau
 Lužany Chateau

M

 Mačice Chateau
 Malešice Chateau
 Manětín Chateau
 Merklín Chateau
 Měcholupy Chateau
 Měčín Chateau
 Mirošov Chateau
 Mlázovy Chateau
 Mochtín Chateau
 Mokrosuky Chateau

N

 Nahošice Chateau
 Nalžovy Chateau
 Nebílovy Chateau
 Nečtinský Špičák Castle
 Nečtiny Chateau
 Nedražice Chateau
 Nekmíř Chateau
 Netřeby Castle
 Nový Čestín Chateau
 Nový Dvůr Chateau
 Nový Herštejn Castle

O
 Osek u Rokycan Chateau
 Oselce Chateau
 Osvračín Castle
 Osvračín Chateau

P

 Pajrek Castle
 Palvinov Chateau
 Petrovice Castle
 Plánice Chateau
 Pňovany Chateau
 Poběžovice Chateau
 Podhůří Chateau
 Podmokly Castle
 Podmokly Chateau
 Podolí Chateau
 Potštejn u Žinkov Castle
 Prašný Újezd Chateau
 Prácheň Castle
 Preitenštejn Castle
 Prostiboř Castle
 Přestavlky Chateau
 Přimda Castle
 Příchovice Chateau
 Příkopy Castle
 Přívozec Chateau
 Ptenín Chateau
 Pustý Hrádek Castle
 Pušperk Castle

R

 Rabí Castle
 Rabštejn nad Střelou Chateau
 Radčice Chateau
 Radeč Castle
 Radnice Chateau
 Radyně Castle
 Rochlov Chateau
 Roupov Castle
 Ruchomperk Castle
 Rýzmberk Castle
 Řebřík Castle

S

 Skála Castle
 Soustov Castle
 Spálené Poříčí Chateau
 Starý Herštejn Castle
 Starý Smolivec Chateau
 Strašice Castle
 Strašná skála Castle
 Svatovítský zámek Chateau
 Svinná Chateau
 Svojšín Chateau
 Sychrov Castle
 Šelmberk Castle
 Šontál Castle
 Štěnovice Chateau
 Šťáhlavy Chateau
 Švihov Castle

T

 Tachov Chateau
 Terešov Chateau
 Tetětice Chateau
 Tisová Chateau
 Trpísty Chateau
 Třebel Castle
 Týnec Chateau

U
 Ujčín Chateau
 Újezd Chateau
 Újezdec Chateau, Mochtín
 Úlice Chateau

V

 Vatětice Chateau
 Velhartice Castle
 Veselí Chateau
 Věžka Castle
 Vimberk Castle
 Vlčtejn Castle
 Volfštejn Castle
 Vrtba Castle
 Všeruby Castle

Z

 Záluží Chateau
 Zbiroh Chateau
 Zelená Hora Chateau
 Zvíkovec Chateau
 Ždánov Chateau
 Železná Ruda Chateau
 Žichovice Chateau
 Žihle Chateau
 Žihobce Chateau
 Žinkovy Chateau
 Životice Chateau

See also
 List of castles in the Czech Republic
 List of castles in Europe
 List of castles

External links 
 Czech Republic - Manors, Castles, Historical Towns
 Hrady.cz 

Castles in the Plzeň Region
Plzen